The Elaine Bennett Research Prize, awarded every other year by the American Economic Association, "recognizes and honors outstanding research in any field of economics by a woman not more than seven years beyond her Ph.D." First awarded in 1998, three of the first six winners of this prize have been the first three female winners of the John Bates Clark Medal.

Past recipients

See also

 List of awards honoring women
 List of economics awards
 John Bates Clark Medal

References

Economics awards
Awards established in 1998
1998 establishments in the United States
Awards honoring women